Labeo degeni is fish in genus Labeo from the Congo River.

References 

 

Labeo
Fish described in 1920